The Early County School District is a public school district in Early County, Georgia, United States, based in Blakely. It serves the communities of Arlington, Blakely, Damascus, and Jakin.

Schools
The Early County School District has one elementary school, one middle school, one high school, and one alternative school.

Elementary school
Early County Elementary School
ECES serves approximately 1100 students in grades Pre-K through 5. The current principal is Matthew Cullifer.

Middle school
Early County Middle School

ECMS serves students in grades 6-8. The current principal is Angela Bell

High school
Early County High School

ECHS serves students grades 9-12. The current principal is Tammy Kilgore.

Alternative school
Learning and Opportunity Academy

References

External links

Hilton School historical marker
Sowhatchee Elementary School historical marker

School districts in Georgia (U.S. state)
Education in Early County, Georgia
Schools in Early County, Georgia